E. Ahamed (29 April 1938 – 1 February 2017), Edappakath Ahamed in full, was an Indian politician from Kannur (then Cannanore) in northern Kerala. A Member of Parliament (Lok Sabha) between 1991 and 2017, he was a key figure in India's diplomatic relations with the Middle East.

Educated at Brennen College, Tellicherry and Trivandrum Law College, Ahamed was first elected to Kerala Legislative Assembly in 1967 (from Kannur,  with Indian Union Muslim League). He later served as a cabinet minister (Industry) in the U D F ministry headed by Congress-leader K. Karunakaran (1982–87). He was first elected to the Parliament (Lok Sabha) in 1991. Ahamed was appointed Union Minister of State, Ministry of External Affairs, in 2004 (Congress-led U P A ministry headed by Manmohan Singh). He also served as Union Minister of State for Railways and Human Resource Development.

Ahamed served as the National President, Indian Union Muslim League between 2008 and 2017. He was the first Indian Union Muslim League union minister in independent India. In 2004, he was famously dispatched by Atal Bihari Vajpayee to the United Nations (Geneva) to represent India.

Early life 
E. Ahamed was born on 29 April 1938 at Cannanore, Malabar District to Edappakath Nafeesa Beevi and Ovintakath Abdul Khader (in a merchant family). He carried his mother's 'house name' as his initials as the tradition among the Cannanore Mappilas.

He graduated from Government Brennen College, Tellicherry and later obtained a law degree from Trivandrum Law College. He was the first General Secretary of the M. S. F., the students' wing of Indian Union Muslim League. He also worked as a reporter for the Chandrika newsapaper. Ahamed married Zuhara in 1961 (died in an accident in 1999). The couple has three children.

Political career

In Kerala 

 Ahamed served as Minister for Industry from May 1982 to March 1987 (U D F ministry headed by Congress-leader K. Karunakaran).
 He was a member of the Kerala and Calicut University Senate. He was also Chairman, Kannur Municipal Council (1981–83).
 He also served as the founder Chairman, Kerala State Rural Development Board (1971–77), and Chairman, Kerala Small Industries Development Corporation.
 Ahamed was chosen as the General Secretary, Indian Union Muslim League in 1995.

Career in national politics 

 From 2004 to 2009, Ahamed served as the Minister of State for External Affairs. From 2009 to 2011, he was the Minister of State for Railways. He assumed charge again as Minister of State for External Affairs in early 2011. Ahamed also held the additional charge of the Union Minister of State, Human Resource Development 2011 to 2012.

Other positions 
President

 Muslim Educational Foundation, Panur, Kannur
 Kannur Deenul Islam Sabha, Kerala

Member

 Board of the Medical College, Pariyaram, Kerala
 Managing Committee, MEA Engineering College, Malappuram
 Executive Council, Aligarh Muslim University
 Central Haj Committee

Representing India 

 Ahamed represented India in the United Nations several times between 1991 and 2014.
 Special Emissary, Prime Minister Indira Gandhi to the Gulf (1984).
 Chairman, Crisis Management Group (Iraq hostage crisis, August–September, 2004).

Minister in different ministries

Death
Ahamed died on 1 February 2017 after suffering a cardiac arrest in a joint session of Parliament. He was buried with full state honours at the Kannur City Juma Masjid.

References

External links
 Official website
 E. Ahamed (profile) Lok Sabha
 Media Center

|-

|-

|-

1938 births
2017 deaths
India MPs 1991–1996
India MPs 1996–1997
India MPs 1998–1999
India MPs 1999–2004
India MPs 2004–2009
Union ministers of state of India
Malayali politicians
India MPs 2009–2014
Indian Union Muslim League politicians
Lok Sabha members from Kerala
India MPs 2014–2019
People from Malappuram district
Kerala MLAs 1980–1982
Government Law College, Thiruvananthapuram alumni